The February 25–27, 2010 North American blizzard (also known as the "Snowicane") was a winter storm and severe weather event that occurred in the Mid-Atlantic and New England regions of the United States between February 24–26, 2010. Aside from precipitation, the Nor'easter brought hurricane-force sustained winds to coastal New England.

This storm was a complex combination of multiple systems, including an upper air low from the northern Great Plains states, and a surface low from the Gulf Coast states. As the surface low tracked northeast from the coast of North Carolina, the upper air low transferred its energy to it, eventually enabling the new storm to undergo rapid intensification near the shore of eastern Long Island. A strong blocking regime of high pressure over the Canadian Maritime provinces prevented the storm system from exiting to the east. This resulted in a cutoff low (not influenced by the predominant jet stream currents), which took a highly unusual track, retrograding west into New York state before looping back out to sea.

Impact

Connecticut
Many parts of Connecticut received heavy rainfall from this storm as well as high winds. Rainfall totals above  were widespread over the state. Colder air worked into the state overnight on February 25, changing the rain to snow statewide by the morning of February 26. Schools were closed and train service was reduced on the Metro-North New Haven Line.

Delaware
Northern Delaware received , and lesser amounts were recorded in Kent and Sussex counties.

Maine
High winds combined with heavy snow were helping bring down power lines early Friday, leaving nearly 100,000 residents out of power in Maine.

Maryland
Snowfall in Maryland from the storm was mostly limited to Garrett County and western Allegany County, where blizzard conditions and deep drifting snow made travel very difficult or impossible on Interstate 68 and U.S. Route 40 in the mountainous western panhandle of the state on February 26. However, strong winds led to scattered power outages in and around Baltimore. As many as 12,500 customers were without power early on Friday, February 26.

Massachusetts
Unofficial wind measurements at Plum Island exceeded 90 mph. Sustained winds in excess of tropical storm force and heavy rain caused large tree branches in the region to break. This led to power outages, and delays on area transport networks. A spokesman for the Massachusetts Emergency Management Agency reported 85,000 customers in Essex and Middlesex counties were without power the morning of February 26.

MBTA Green Line service on the Riverside Branch was suspended due to fallen branches on the evening of February 25 until the morning of the 26th. A commuter rail locomotive leaving Rowley on the Newburyport/Rockport Line was struck by a large falling tree, resulting in a shutdown of service late in the evening on February 25, with service delays reported the following day.

Flooding was also an issue in the area. About a dozen homes and businesses in Freetown were vacated voluntarily amidst concern that Forge Pond Dam on the Assonet River might burst due to high levels of water from heavy rain.

New Hampshire
More than 230,000 homes and business lost power due to the storm in New Hampshire. High winds from this storm fueled a five-alarm fire that destroyed five homes in Hampton Beach. The winds hindered firefighters' efforts to bring the fire under control. No casualties were reported.

New Jersey
Various power utilities reported outages in the state that affected about 14,000 customers.
Blowing snow caused by strong winds created snow drifts; blockades for some drivers. Blizzard Warnings and Winter Storm Warnings were posted throughout the state of New Jersey. Ice and snow mixed to cause major roads to transform into hazards for all drivers. Most counties in the southern part got  during the storm but snow from the past storms didn't make it any better. Delays in Camden and Newark Airports were possibly 2 hours or more. Visibility was reduced to below  in most areas. Also, houses took major damage.

New York

The system began making landfall in the New York region as early as late Wednesday and was the most active area of the storm. The storm left more than 150,000 homes and businesses in the state without power. In the Hudson Valley, almost 150,000 Central Hudson Gas & Electric customers lost power during the storm, the most in the utility's history.

The New York State Police reported two fatalities resulting from the weather. Heavy snow forced New York State troopers to close  of Interstate 84 from Newburgh to the Connecticut state line, as well as sections of the Taconic Parkway. New York State transportation officials required vehicles to be equipped with snow chains or 4-wheel drive to travel on passable roadways within the storm's impact area; vehicles lacking chains or 4-wheel drive were stopped or turned back at inspection checkpoints.

In New York City,  fell in Central Park, mixed with slushy accumulation due to above-freezing temperatures during the day. Falling tree branches due to the heavy wet snow and strong winds resulted in one casualty (Elmaz Qyra) in Central Park and created dangerous conditions on the streets. The New York City Sanitation Department deployed 1600 snow plow and 365 salt spraying trucks to keep traffic flowing smoothly on the highways and city streets of the five boroughs. New York City experienced its 5th largest snowstorm on record, 4th at the time. This, combined with a winter storm earlier in the month resulted in February 2010 becoming the snowiest month on record in New York City.

Several private schools and institutions cancelled classes on Friday, February 26, due to the storm. City mayor Michael Bloomberg originally decided to keep the public schools running on Friday, but acquiesced later when the weather condition worsened overnight.

New York City area's three major airports canceled more than 1,000 flights. About 3,000 usually leave the airports daily. New Jersey Transit canceled buses into New York City. Rail service in New Jersey and Long Island was suspended or delayed.

On February 27, ice from an upper floor of the Sony Building crashed through the building's atrium glass ceiling, injuring at least 15 people attending a Purim party.

Pennsylvania
On February 24, 2010, PennDOT officials initially requested through local media that drivers stay off the roads during the storm that was expected to hit Pennsylvania on 25–26 February. Officials said interstates and other high-traffic highways would be treated first. Secondary state routes were noted as a lower priority during the severe storms that impacted the state in 2009–10. PennDOT officials noted that they had more than 480,000 tons of salt in stock, and that so far, $159 million of the $180 million winter budget had already been spent. If that budget were exhausted, PennDOT would tap funds normally reserved for spring maintenance.

In the early morning of February 25, several communities in Berks, Lancaster and Lebanon counties issued snow emergencies.

At 1:00 p.m.

At 6:00 p.m.

On both February 25 and 26, the Philadelphia School District and the Archdiocese of Philadelphia canceled classes for all public and archdiocesan schools in the city of Philadelphia, as well as all archdiocesan schools in the nearby suburbs. Most suburban schools also were closed on both days. Due to the shifting track of the storm, the city of Philadelphia did not receive as much snow as had been predicted, with totals only approaching .

Whiteout conditions and multiple crashes in the early morning of February 26 forced an indefinite closure of the Pennsylvania Turnpike in both directions between Carlisle and Breezewood.

On Friday, PPL reported several hundred people without power, most of them in Schuylkill County. Met-Ed reported power outages in Adams, Lebanon and Berks counties.

Overall, areas to the southwest of the city received lesser accumulations while mountainous areas to the east received substantially higher accumulations. The storm created major traffic-related issues on the city's major transportation arteries, including Interstates 79, 279, and 376.

Rhode Island
Drenching rains from the storm may have caused a retaining wall in a Providence parking lot to collapse, leading to a washout of the ground underneath.

West Virginia
Blizzard conditions and heavy snowfall in the eastern mountains of the state bordering Maryland led the West Virginia Department of Transportation to close a portion of Interstate 68. A Blizzard Warning was posted as far south as Bluefield, West Virginia.

Canada
Over  of snow was reported in some areas of Quebec, with over 100,000 residents suffering power outages on February 26. Snowsqualls combined with bands of westward-progressing snow over Ontario to produce heavy snow as well as periods of freezing rain in some locations.

"Snowicane" controversy
They used words such as "hurricane-like conditions" and "snowicane" to describe the upcoming event. The National Weather Service forecast called for less severe conditions. National Weather Service meteorologist Craig Evanego said the use of these terms was not responsible, could lead to panic and noted that "snowicane" was not in the glossary of meteorology. The Weather Channel called the use of the term "bad meteorology". Accuweather defended the use of the terms, saying their forecasts are geared toward the general public and these terms were used to make the event more understandable to them. It was also noted that the barometric pressure would be equivalent to that of a Category 2 hurricane.

See also

List of Regional Snowfall Index Category 4 winter storms
 North American blizzard of 2009
 February 5–6, 2010 North American blizzard
 February 9–10, 2010 North American blizzard
 March 2010 North American winter storm
 Winter storms of 2009–2010

References

Blizzards in the United States
Blizzards in Canada
2010 meteorology
2010 natural disasters in the United States
2010 disasters in Canada
2009–10 North American winter
February 2010 events in the United States
Natural disasters in New York (state)